Newhouse Records is an independent record label that began in 2000, by releasing vintage funk compilations.  Then continued with releases of the funk fusion group, Cymande.  The following Cymande albums have been released by Newhouse; The Soul of Rasta (limited pressing 2000), Cymande, Renegades of Funk (2005), and Cymande - Promised Heights (2007).

The label also focuses on jazz, dance, electronica, funk, soul and deep house music and has released compilations of artists in this market.  One notable project included tracks by St. Germain (musician), and a new roster of French artists, Kia, Florian, The Bottle, Versus, and Terrasse Tranquille featured on the album, Paris Under a Groove, which showcased "French touch," style of jazz/funk, deep house, and electronica music.

The album Paris Under a Groove was released in 2003.  This album launched the "Under A Groove."
brand which led to the follow-up album called, San Francisco Under a Groove released in 2005.

American record labels
House music record labels
Record labels established in 2000